The Herreshoff Marine Museumis a maritime museum in Bristol, Rhode Island dedicated to the history of the Herreshoff Manufacturing Company, yachting, and America's Cup. The Herreshoff Manufacturing Company (1878–1945) was most notable for producing sailing yachts, including eight America's Cup defenders, and steam-powered vessels.

The museum, situated near Narragansett Bay on the grounds where the manufacturing company once stood, has a collection of over sixty boats including Nathanael Greene Herreshoff's Clara, built in 1887, Harold Vanderbilt's Trivia, and the 1992 IACC yacht, Defiant.   The Nathanael Greene Herreshoff Model Room contains over 500 yacht and steam yacht models and the Rebecca Chase Herreshoff Library holds a collection of books and manuscripts related to the company, the Herreshoff family, and yachting. The museum also hosts symposia related to yacht design and operates a sailing school.

History
The museum was founded in 1971 by A. Sidney DeWolf Herreshoff and Rebecca Chase Herreshoff to preserve the accomplishments of the Herreshoff Manufacturing Company.  In 1992, founded by Halsey Chase Herreshoff and Edward duMoulin, the museum launched the America's Cup Hall of Fame to honor outstanding individuals of the America's Cup yacht race.

Works
Among other works, the company built Doris (Sailing yacht), which is listed on the U.S. National Register of Historic Places.

See also
  Herreshoff family
  List of maritime museums in the United States
  List of museum ships

References

External links
Official site

Maritime museums in Rhode Island
Museums in Bristol County, Rhode Island
Museums established in 1971
Steam yachts
Industry museums in Rhode Island
Sports museums in Rhode Island
Buildings and structures in Bristol, Rhode Island